Gideon Gaye is the second studio album by the Anglo-Irish avant-pop band the High Llamas, released in 1994 on the Brighton-based Target label. Notable for anticipating the mid 1990s easy-listening revivalism, the album's music was influenced by Brian Wilson, Steely Dan, Brazilian bossa nova and European film soundtracks, and was recorded with a £4000 budget. It was met with high praise by the British press. Q dubbed the LP "the best Beach Boys album since 1968's Friends". In the US, the album was indifferently promoted.

Background
Upon release, bandleader Sean O'Hagan responded to Beach Boys comparisons: "There are aspects that are blatantly Brian-esque, because I've always been a huge Brian [Wilson] fan. He has been the biggest influence in my career to date. I was always shy [about] how much I liked him, but this time I decided to be blatant about it. But then I'm also a huge John Cale fan." The album's sleeve art is a homage to Van Dyke Parks' 1967 album Song Cycle, which uses the same Torino Italic Flair typeface.

Critical reception

Scott Schinder of Trouser Press reviewed: "The result is a homespun, heartfelt art-pop masterpiece, with airy arrangements and gorgeous melodies in richly detailed tunes — 'The Dutchman,' 'Checking In, Checking Out,' 'The Goat Looks On' and the fourteen-minute 'Track Goes By' — that liberally quote Brian Wilson's lost classic [Smile] without sacrificing O'Hagan's purposefully playful point of view." Writer Tim Page called the album "suffused throughout with a gentle wistfulness that is never made quite explicit ... [the album] is also intriguing on a purely formal level. The album's centerpiece is 'The Goat Looks On,' yet the entire disc might be described as a study of the creation of a song called 'The Goat Looks On.'"

Critic Richie Unterberger opined: "It's an impressive outing that sounds like little else in the alternative rock world of the mid-'90s. But it only establishes O'Hagan and his various pals as charming emulators, rather than true innovators. CMJ New Music Monthlys Steve McGuirl wrote of the album: "A tad academic, perhaps; but to dismiss Gideon Gaye as merely retro cheapens a beautiful record and the music that inspired it."

Track listing

Personnel
Per AllMusic.

The High Llamas
 Rob Allum – drums, percussion
 John Fell – bass
 Marcus Holdaway – cello, harpsichord, organ, piano, upright piano, string arrangements, vibe master, vibraphone, vocals, background vocals, Vox organ
 Sean O'Hagan – composer, glockenspiel, guitar, Moog bass, Moog synthesizer, organ, piano, upright piano, producer, string arrangements, vocals, background vocals, Vox organ

Additional staff
 Andre – layout design
 Charles Francis – engineer, producer
 Anthony Lyons – layout design
 Jocelyn Pook – viola
 Anne Wood – violin

Charts

References

External links
 

The High Llamas albums
1994 albums
Art pop albums
Experimental pop albums
V2 Records albums